Ichoria demona is a moth of the subfamily Arctiinae. It was described by Herbert Druce in 1897. It is found in Mexico.

References

Arctiinae
Moths described in 1897